In mathematics, the regular part of a Laurent series consists of the series of terms with positive powers. That is, if

then the regular part of this Laurent series is

In contrast, the series of terms with negative powers is the principal part.

References

Complex analysis